Jidhi is a village located in Awdal, Somaliland.

Demographics
As of 2012, the population of Jidhi has been estimated to be 248. The town inhabitants belong to various mainly Afro-Asiatic-speaking ethnic groups, with the Issa Somali predominant.

Populated places in Awdal